Geraldo Pereira may refer to:

Geraldo Dutra Pereira (born 1963), Brazilian footballer
Geraldo Rocha Pereira (born 1994), Brazilian footballer
Geraldo Theodoro Pereira (1918-1955), Brazilian composer and samba star